Evann Siebens is a Canadian media artist with a background in dancing based in Vancouver, British Columbia, Canada. Her current practice cross-references dance performance and media. Siebens' film works have been shown both nationally and internationally and have won awards.  She recently exhibited a geodesic dome and 360 projection at the Belkin Gallery in Vancouver and also screened a commissioned work on the exterior of the Vancouver Art Gallery. Her moving billboard Orange Magpies Triptych was part of Capture’s Photography Festival. She has also performed live with her media at New Media Gallery and the Western Front, Vancouver.

Siebens writes about dance films and techniques for applying filmmaking to dance, and has been praised for her practical insights into the filming of dance and the creative interactions between dance and film technique which she credits for expanding the cinematic experience: “I’m interested in breaking the frame, in moving beyond the traditional two-dimensional space of film, in questioning the status quo. The visual transgressions of dance media, that on the surface seem so simple and pleasing, are an entry point for feminists and activists to have their say, an allowance for the complexity of politics, enabled by the moving body through time and space.”

Siebens is represented by Wil Aballe Art Projects in Vancouver.

Education
Evann Siebens studied dance at the National Ballet School of Canada and the Royal Ballet School in London, England. She danced with the National Ballet of Canada and the Bonn Ballet in Germany.

Siebens graduated from New York University in 1996, with a Bachelor of Arts, magna cum laude. 
She participated in residencies at the Banff Centre, Banff, Calgary, UNIT/PITT, Vancouver, ACME, London UK, with Keith Doyle and TRII Art Hub Residency in Athens, Greece.

Work

Film 

Siebens has filmed dancers such as Mikhail Baryshnikov, Peter Boal,  Viola Farber, Bill T. Jones, Jose Navas, and Sara Rudner.
Siebens' documentaries have been screened at the Museum of Modern Art (MOMA) in New York and on PBS.

Her documentary film American Aloha, with Lisette Marie Flanary, focuses on the history and rebirth of hula dancing. It was produced for the PBS POV series. The film was made on a budget of $300,000. Filmed over  period of five years, it focuses on three kumu hula or hula masters teaching in California: Sissy Kaio of Hula Halau O Lilinoʻe, Mark Kealiʻi Hoʻomalu of Na Mele Hula ‘Ohana and Patrick Makuakāne of Na Lei Hulu I Ka Wekiu. The film breaks down stereotypes about hula, in part by focusing on male dancers as well as females. To successfully complete the film, it was necessary to spend time with the Hawaiian hula community and win their trust. The film won a CINE Golden Eagle Award in 2003, a Silver Hugo Award at the Chicago International Television Festival, and the Bronze Award in Cultural Documentary at WorldFest Houston. The film also screened at the Hawai‘i International Film Festival, and the Native American Film and Video Festival at the Smithsonian Institution.

Siebens' 2018 short film time reversal symmetry was part of a collaboration between artists and scientists at TRIUMF: Canada’s national laboratory for particle and nuclear physics. It screened at the Dance on Camera Festival in New York City, the Seyr Festival in Tehran, Iran, the Dublin Dance Festival and the Light Moves Festival of Screendance in Limerick, Ireland, where it won the Light Moves Prize for Outstanding Overall Work. She has collaborated with dancer/choreographer Justine A. Chambers.

Cross Disciplinary Projects 
Siebens has exhibited at Eyebeam, 
Centre Georges Pompidou, 
Vancouver Art Gallery, Vancouver, British Columbia, 
Hotshoe Gallery, London, UK, G++ Media Gallery, Victoria, Canada and Wil Abelle Art Projects in Vancouver.

Siebens' performance piece Orange Magpies was commissioned by Vancouver's Burrard Arts Foundation and Vancouver Art Gallery in 2017. 
This work was subsequently exhibited as a large-scale projection on the facade of the Vancouver Art Gallery as part of the Facade Festival that same year. Siebens' video documented a six minute, choreographed piece performed by dancers James Gnam and Vanessa Goodman. They are featured in locations from across the Lower Mainland of Vancouver, many of them unceded traditional territories of First Nations peoples such as the Coast Salish, the Squamish, the Tsleil-Waututh and the Musqueam. Siebens' intent as a non-Indigenous artist was "to use the mediums of dance and film to explore issues of colonialism and her role in reconciliation."

Awards
She has received notable awards in her career as an artist, such as; MIMMiC Commission from On Main Gallery + Paul Wong Projects, Vancouver, Canada. Gesture, 2015, ID / Identities Istanbul 2012; Best Video Prize for Chromatic Revelry, 2012. Her work has been supported by The National Endowment for the Arts, The New York State Council for the Arts, and The Corporation for Public Broadcasting amongst others.

References

Living people
Canadian documentary film directors
Canadian women film directors
Film directors from Calgary
New York University alumni
National Ballet of Canada dancers
People educated at the Royal Ballet School
Year of birth missing (living people)
Canadian women documentary filmmakers